Jana Brown is an American attorney and politician serving as a member of the Vermont House of Representatives for the Chittenden-1 district. Elected in November 2020, she assumed office on January 6, 2021.

Early life and education 
Brown was raised in Fair Haven, Vermont. She earned a Bachelor of Arts degree in literature and Spanish from Ohio Wesleyan University and a Juris Doctor from the Ohio State University Moritz College of Law.

Career 
Brown began her career as an attorney in the Ohio Attorney General's Office. She then returned to Vermont, where she worked in the Civil Litigation Division of the Vermont Attorney General's Office. Since 2014, she has been the executive director of the Children’s Literacy Foundation. Brown was elected to the Vermont House of Representatives in November 2020 and assumed office on January 6, 2021.

References 

Living people
People from Fair Haven, Vermont
People from Rutland County, Vermont
Ohio Wesleyan University alumni
Ohio State University Moritz College of Law alumni
Ohio lawyers
Vermont lawyers
Members of the Vermont House of Representatives
Women state legislators in Vermont
Year of birth missing (living people)